Dūda is a Baltic surname. Notable people with the name include:

Andrejs Dūda (born 1981), Latvian swimmer
Rimantas Dūda (born 1953), Lithuanian painter

See also
Duda (disambiguation)
Duda (name)

Latvian-language surnames
Lithuanian-language surnames